Abdul Ghani bin Gilong (30 May 1932 – 6 March 2021) was a Malaysian politician. He was a federal cabinet minister in various portfolios from 1968 to 1978.

Early life
Ghani was born as Ganie Gilong on 30 May 1932 in Ranau to Gilong Rantau, a prominent trader and Bonggo Dumaring. He had five siblings.

He started his tertiary education in an attap school in his hometown in 1938. During the Second World War, he attended Japanese school and later, a primary school run by the British, before continuing his education at Sacred Heart School in Primary One again. He attended school up to Form Four thus he did not sit for the Form Five examination as he thought that he was too old at 23 years old.

In 1955, he returned to Ranau to help his parents and was very active in business and volunteerism during his time in Ranau. He was also the first agent to look after visitors and climbers to Mount Kinabalu. Ghani became a Ranau district councilor and was in residency team to represent Ranau. His past experience of hardship to walk for four days from Ranau to reach Kota Kinabalu made him resolve to find ways to alleviate this problem and to initiate the road links between the east and west coasts of Sabah later in his life.

Political career
His political career started after an acquaintance with Donald Stephens who has encouraged Ghani to write short articles in North Borneo News and Sabah Times. Their friendship had triggered his involvement in the new political party United National Kadazan Organisation (UNKO) founded by Donald in 1961. This also led to his collaboration in the efforts for the independence of Sabah and formation of Malaysia in 1963.

In 1962, after returning from New Zealand from a six-month leadership course, Ghani was first appointed to the legislative assembly by Sir William Goode to represent Ranau until he resigned to take up his federal ministerial post in 1968. When UNKO and United Pasok Momogun Organisation (UPMO) merged into United Pasokmomogun Kadazan Organisation (UPKO) in 1964 and Ghani was elected deputy president of UPKO.

In 1967, he stood and won as a candidate for UPKO. In 1967, UPKO was dissolved and all members were absorbed into United Sabah National Organisation (USNO) during which Ghani became a vice president of USNO.

In 1968, Ghani at that time at the age of 36, was appointed to the federal cabinet by Tunku Abdul Rahman to the post of Minister of Sabah Affairs and Civil Defence. He served in the federal cabinet from 1968 to 1978 under three prime ministers, Tunku Abdul Rahman, Tun Abdul Razak and Tun Hussein Onn, holding the portfolios of Minister of Justice, Minister of Transport, acting Minister of Health and Agriculture, Minister of Works and Utilities.

Ghani was re-elected to parliament in 1974, and in 1975 joined Tun Fuad Donald Stephens and Harris Salleh  in the formation of the new political party Sabah People's United Front (BERJAYA). He however left BERJAYA before the state election in 1976, rejoining USNO, and later lost his parliamentary seat in the 1978 election.

Death
On 6 March 2021, Abdul Ghani Gilong died due to complications suspected caused by COVID-19 at 12.12 am at Queen Elizabeth Hospital, Kota Kinabalu. He was 88. He was buried at the family burial ground in Kampung Silou, Ranau.

Honours and awards

Honours of Malaysia
  :
  Recipient of the Malaysian Commemorative Medal (Silver) (PPM) (1965)
  Commander of the Order of Loyalty to the Crown of Malaysia (PSM) - Tan Sri (1999)
  :
  Grand Commander of the Order of Kinabalu (SPDK) - Datuk Seri Panglima (1990)

Awards
 Luguan Siou Kaamatan (Tokoh Kaamatan) in 2010
 Tokoh Malaysia in 2010

Honorary degrees
  :
 Honorary Ph.D. degree from Universiti Malaysia Sabah (2017)

See also
 List of deaths due to COVID-19 - notable individual deaths

References

1932 births
2021 deaths
People from Sabah
Converts to Islam
Kadazan-Dusun people
Malaysian Muslims
Sabah People's United Front politicians
United Sabah National Organisation politicians
United Pasokmomogun Kadazan Organisation politicians
Government ministers of Malaysia
Members of the Dewan Rakyat
Members of the Sabah State Legislative Assembly
Grand Commanders of the Order of Kinabalu
Commanders of the Order of Loyalty to the Crown of Malaysia
Deaths from the COVID-19 pandemic in Malaysia
20th-century Malaysian politicians